Selvaggina, Go Back into the Woods is a live album by Coil, originally released in CD-R format in a limited edition of 230 copies. The release is a live performance in Jesi, Italy on 11 July 2004.

Release
Selvaggina was released in a sleeve identical to that of Coil Presents Time Machines, Megalithomania!, and the original version of Black Antlers.

Background
Tracks 1-3 and 5-7 were released as studio versions with slightly augmented titles on Black Antlers. "Bang Bang" has not been given a studio release by Coil. "Tattooed Man" was later remade and released on The Ape of Naples. The live version of "Amethyst Deceivers" on Selvaggina is most similar to the versions released on The Ape of Naples and Live Two.

For this performance, Coil were John Balance, Peter Christopherson and Thighpaulsandra.

Track listing
Here is the list of Selvaggina, Go Back into the Woods
 "The Gimp - Sometimes" – 8:03
 "Sex with Sun Ra" – 8:13
 "All the Pretty Little Horses" – 3:18
 "Tattooed Man" – 10:21
 "Teenage Lightning" – 8:43
 "Wraiths and Strays" – 6:48
 "Black Antlers" – 5:35
 "Bang Bang" – 3:21
 "Amethyst Deceivers" – 10:31

References

External links
 
 
 Selvaggina, Go Back into the Woods at Brainwashed

2004 live albums
Coil (band) live albums
Threshold House live albums